Antonín Dvořák's Requiem in B minor, Op. 89, B. 165, is a funeral Mass scored for soloists, choir and orchestra. It was composed in 1890 and performed for the first time on 9 October 1891, in Birmingham, England, with the composer conducting.

Structure

Part I

Part II

The approximate duration of the work is 95 minutes.

Orchestration 
The work is scored for:

Voices:
soprano solo
alto solo
tenor solo
bass solo
SATB choir

Woodwinds:
piccolo
2 flutes
2 oboes
cor anglais
2 clarinets
bass clarinet
2 bassoons
contrabassoon

organ

Brass:
4 horns
4 trumpets
3 trombones (two tenor and one bass)
tuba

Percussion:
timpani
tam-tam
campane (not in the original score)

Strings:
harp (Offertorium and Hostias only)
violins I, II
violas
cellos
double basses

Selected recordings 
 Antonín Dvořák: Rekviem – Czech Philharmonic, Czech Philharmonic Chorus, conducted by Karel Ančerl, chorus master Markéta Kühnová; soloists: Maria Stader – soprano, Sieglinde Wagner – alt, Ernst Haefliger – tenor, Kim Borg – bass. Supraphon, 1959, re-edition on 2 CD 1991 (Ančerl Gold Edition no.13). This recording was awarded the "Grand Prix du disque de l´Académie Charles Cros".
 Dvořák: Requiem for soloists, chorus and orchestra, Op. 89 – Czech Philharmonic, Kühn's mixed choir, conductor Wolfgang Sawallisch; soloists: Gabriela Beňačková, Brigitte Fassbaender, Thomas Moser, Jan-Hendrik Rootering.
 Dvořák: Requiem b-moll, Op. 89 – London Symphony Orchestra, conductor István Kertesz, Ambrosian Singers choir, soloists: Pilar Lorengar, Róbert Ilosfalvy, Tom Krause; published by Decca.
 Dvořák: Requiem, Op. 89, New Jersey Symphony Orchestra, conductor Zdeněk Mácal, Westminster Choir, soloists: Oksana Krovytska (soprano), Wendy Hoffman (mezzo-soprano), John Aler (tenor), Gustav Beláček (bass). 1999 Delos.
 Dvořák: Requiem, Op. 89, Capella Weilburgensis, conductor Doris Hagel, Kantorei der Schlosskirche Weilburg, soloists: Mechthild Bach (soprano), Stefanie Irányi (mezzo-soprano), Markus Schäfer (tenor), Klaus Mertens (bass). 2006 Profil – Edition Günter Hänssler.
 Dvořák, Requiem, Symphony No. 8''' Royal Concertgebouw Orchestra, conductor Mariss Jansons, Wiener Singverein, soloists: Krassimira Stoyanova (soprano), Mihoko Fujimura (mezzo-soprano), Klaus Florian Vogt (tenor), Thomas Quasthoff (bass). 2010 RCO Live.
 Dvořák: Requiem, Op. 89, Warsaw National Philharmonic Orchestra and Chorus, conductor Antoni Wit, soloists:  (soprano), Ewa Wolak (alto),  (tenor), Janusz Monarcha (bass). 2014 Naxos Records.
 Antonín Dvořák: Requiem – Royal Flemish Philharmonic, Collegium Vocale Gent, conductor Philippe Herreweghe; soloists: Ilse Eerens (soprano), Bernarda Fink (mezzo-soprano), Maximilian Schmitt (tenor), Nathan Berg (bass). 2015 PHI, Outhere.
 Dvořák: Requiem, Biblical Songs, Te Deum'' – Czech Philharmonic, Prague Philharmonic Choir, conductor Jakub Hrůša, conductor Jiří Bělohlávek, soloists: Ailyn Pérez (soprano),  (mezzo-soprano), Michael Spyres (tenor), Svatopluk Sem (baritone). 2020 Decca Records.

Notes

External links
 
 Dvořák's "Requiem". Spanish Radio and Television Symphony Orchestra and Chorus. Carlos Kalmar, conductor.

Compositions by Antonín Dvořák
Dvorak
1890 compositions
Music for orchestra and organ
Compositions in B-flat minor